Blepharodes is a genus of North African mantis in the family Empusidae.

Species  
The Mantodea Species File currently includes:
 Blepharodes candelarius Bolivar 1890
 Blepharodes cornutus Schulthess 1894
 Blepharodes parumspinosus Beier 1930
 Blepharodes sudanensis Werner 1907

See also
List of mantis genera and species

References

 
Empusidae
Mantodea genera